{{Infobox television
| image              =
| caption            = 
| genre              = Sports
| camera             = 
| picture_format     = PALHDTV 1080i
| audio_format       = 
| runtime            = 30–60 minutes
| creator            = 
| developer          = 
| executive_producer = 
| location           = Studio TC5, BBC Television Centre (1974–2012)dock10 studios (2012–present)
| presenter          = Dan Walker (2009–2021)Alex Scott (2021–)
| country            = United Kingdom
| language           = English
| network            = BBC One
| first_aired        = Grandstand strand–Stand-alone series| last_aired         = present
| num_episodes       = 
| related            = Match of the DayMatch of the Day 2Final ScoreThe Football League ShowThe Premier League Show 
}}Football Focus is a BBC television magazine programme launched in 1974 covering football, normally broadcast live on BBC One on Saturday lunchtimes during the football season. The programme, along with Final Score, is a remnant from the former flagship sports show Grandstand which for decades dominated the BBC One Saturday afternoon TV schedules. Focus programme in its own right in 2001.

The programme is now a weekly magazine, with reports from across the country at all levels of English and Scottish football. It previews the weekend's fixtures and provides updates from the early Premier League game.  Since BBC have the rights to Premier League highlights, Football Focus also shows the key moments from the midweek matches. Prior to the launch of Match of the Day 2, it was often the first chance for free-to-air viewers to see analysis of the Sunday and Monday Premier League games.

As of 2021, presenter Alex Scott is usually joined by the BBC's main football pundits such as Mark Lawrenson, Jermaine Jenas, Martin Keown, Dion Dublin, and Micah Richards. Match of the Day commentators, including Steve Wilson, Guy Mowbray, Jonathan Pearce, and Simon Brotherton often check-in with game previews from the stadiums.

History
For several years up to 1974, Grandstand aired a slot called "Football Preview", previewing the day's matches and in 1974 it was evolved into Football Focus which continued to be part of Grandstand and Focus was the first item of the programme.

From 1988 to 1992, it was reduced to FA Cup weekends due to ITV having exclusive Football League rights and was simply billed as Football, it returned to a weekly schedule from August 1992 when the BBC won the Premier League highlights rights and the Football Focus brand was restored.

In August 2001, Focus became a stand-alone show. 

In 2021, former England and Arsenal right-back Alex Scott became the first full-time female host of the show, presenting her first show on 14 August. She replaced Dan Walker who had presented the show for the previous twelve years.

Presenters 
 pre-1974: – First presenter Sam Leitch
 1974–1994: Bob Wilson (departed to join ITV as its main football presenter)
 1994–1996: Steve Rider (hosted of Focus as part of his duties as presenter of Grandstand)
 1996–1999: Gary Lineker (previously a pundit before he started to present Focus, went on to front Match of the Day)
 1999–2004: Ray Stubbs (left to present Final Score on Saturday afternoons, left BBC in 2009 to move to ESPN)
 2004–2009: Manish Bhasin (left to become presenter of The Football League Show)
 2009–2021: Dan Walker
 2021– : Alex Scott

Guest presenters

2018: Seema Jaswal (one episode)
2016, 2021: Eilidh Barbour (presented during 2016 Olympics while Dan Walker was in Rio, she also presented in late 2021)
2014: Mark Chapman (presented a World Cup special edition)
 2007, 2008: Jake Humphrey (presented during 2007 Ashes and Cricket World Cup while Manish was presenting BBC coverage. Also was main host during Euro 2008 Football Focus)
 2005: Mark Pougatch

Theme song
The theme song for the programme is different for each new season. For the 2002–03 season it was "Backaround" by Elevator Suite. The 2003–04 season featured a cover of the Stevie Nicks track "Stand Back" by Linus Loves featuring Sam Obernik. For the 2007–08 season it was "Kill The Director" by The Wombats and for the 2009–10 season it was "Jetstream" by Doves, from the album Kingdom of Rust. For the 2012–13 season it was "Undegpedwar" by Y Niwl from the self-titled album, and in a break with tradition continued as the theme for 2013–14.

Studio 
The programme is broadcast from BBC Sport's headquarters and main studios in MediaCityUK in Salford, although some episodes are broadcast on location, from football grounds around the country. The studio is located at the dock10 studios facility.

Ahead of the 2019–20 Premier League season, BBC Sport upgraded the studio that Match of the Day, Match of the Day 2, Football Focus, and Final Score broadcasts from. The facility uses a "4K UHD ready virtual reality studio." It uses Epic Games' Unreal Engine 4 rendering technology.

Other versions
A version of the programme focusing on world football airs on BBC World News.

See also 

On the Ball
Saint and Greavsie

References

External links 
 

BBC Television shows
BBC Sport
2001 British television series debuts
2000s British sports television series
2010s British sports television series
2020s British sports television series
Premier League on television
English-language television shows